James Joseph Paulsen (September 25, 1943 – October 25, 2019), known professionally as Joe Sun, was an American country music singer-songwriter. Recording for the Ovation and Elektra Records labels, Sun charted fourteen singles on the Hot Country Songs charts. His highest was his 1978 debut single, the No. 14 "Old Flames Can't Hold a Candle to You."

Biography
He was born in Rochester, Minnesota, United States. He spent his youth in college and then in the Air Force.  He did various jobs, such as working as a DJ at Radio WMAD in Madison, Wisconsin and at a Key West, Florida rock station and he spent two years with a computer firm in Chicago.  While in Madison, he sang with a variety of semi-pro bands, working under the name "Jack Daniels".  He acquired his style listening to southern music on country's 50,000 watt WSM and rhythm and blues WLAC radio.

In 1972, he made his way to Nashville, Tennessee, giving himself five years to "make it" as a musician.  For a time, he ran a small graphics business called The Sun Shop, then took up independent record promotions, which led to signing with the Ovation Records label towards the end of 1977.

Joe Sun's debut and his first single on Ovation Records "Old Flames (Can't Hold A Candle To You)" was released in May 1978 and climbed steadily up the country charts, reaching the Top 20.  Further hits followed on Ovation Records with "High And Dry" (1978), "On Business For The King" (1979), "Blue Ribbon Blues" (1979), "Out Of Your Mind" (1979/1980), "What I Had With You" (1980), "Shotgun Rider" (1980), "Bombed, Boozed, And Busted" (1980), and "Ready For the Times to Get Better" (1980), an innovative re-make of Crystal Gayle's 1978 No. 1 hit.  By the time his third album, Livin' On Honky Tonk Time was released, the record company Ovation closed down.  Sun signed with Elektra, who purchased Ovation in 1981. At that time he recorded "I Ain't Honky Tonkin' No More". The album Best of Joe Sun was released by Elektra.

Sun recorded The Sun Never Sets for Sonet in 1987, followed by Twilight Zone with Dixiefrog in 1986 and Hank Bogart Still Lives with Dixiefrog in 1989.  This album was outsold in France only by Randy Travis.  In 1991, Dixiefrog released Out on the Road, after Sun's five-month European tour.

Sun's first solo album effort, the 1992 Dixie and Me, made its debut on Austria's Crazy Music.  Its response prompted the 1994 CD release of Some Old Memories by the same record label. An album and a video for Some Old Memories were released in 1994 by Crazy Music and was broadcast on SF1, a Swiss television station and 3SAT, a German/Austrian/Swiss television station. Sun released the Heartbreak Saloon CD in 1991 with Dixiefrog.  He wrote twelve of the fifteen songs on the album.

Sun released 15 albums and performed in the United States and Europe.  He also recorded national radio spots for Budweiser and Timberline Boots.  Besides being featured on television shows, having produced two Grammy-nominated foreign albums in 1989 and 1990, Sun also acted as Tommy Fratter in the film Marie alongside Sissy Spacek, Jeff Daniels and Morgan Freeman.

Sun died in Palm Bay, Florida, on October 25, 2019.

Discography

Albums

Singles

Guest singles

References

External links
 Joe Sun's albums Dixie and Me, Some Old Memories
 Joe Sun's videos
 

1943 births
2019 deaths
People from Rochester, Minnesota
Military personnel from Minnesota
Elektra Records artists
American country singer-songwriters
American male singer-songwriters
Singer-songwriters from Minnesota
Ovation Records artists
American people of Danish descent
20th-century American singers
20th-century American male singers
21st-century American singers
21st-century American male singers